Ángel Oscar Prudencio (born 13 October 1990) is an Argentine professional footballer who plays as a forward for Independiente Rivadavia.

Career
Prudencio's career began in the ranks of Instituto, before making the move into their senior squad in 2011. He was on the substitutes bench on 28 May against Ferro Carril Oeste, with his professional bow coming versus Deportivo Merlo on 6 June. In the following August, Prudencio was signed by Argentine Primera División side Racing Club. However, the forward left eleven months later after no appearances. Prudencio joined Santamarina of Torneo Argentino A in July 2012. He netted twice on debut in a win away to Unión Mar del Plata in August. His second season ended with promotion to Primera B Nacional.

With Santamarina now in the second tier, Prudencio was subsequently loaned to Torneo Federal A team Cipolletti. Four appearances followed as they placed sixth in Zone 1. June 2015 saw Prudencio move to Guatemalan football as he agreed to join Suchitepéquez on loan. He scored goals in fixtures with Municipal, Marquense, Comunicaciones, Universidad, Xelajú and Guastatoya in the first part of 2015–16, but missed the rest of the campaign after returning to Santamarina at the end of 2015. In 2016, Prudencio signed for Tiro Federal, though he rejoined tier two's Santamarina six months later after relegation.

Having scored three times in twenty-four matches, Prudencio was on the move again on 17 August 2017 as he joined Defensores de Belgrano in the third tier. His first appearance was in a Copa Argentina tie with top division Belgrano, who eliminated Defensores de Belgrano but Prudencio had scored their only goal. Once more, Prudencio spent a few months away before resigning with Santamarina. He netted twice, including against former team Instituto, in eleven encounters during 2017–18. Prudencio departed the club in January 2019, signing for Talleres in Primera B Metropolitana. Eight goals followed for them.

In January 2020, Prudencio joined Independiente Rivadavia in Primera B Nacional.

Career statistics
.

Honours
Santamarina
Torneo Argentino A: 2013–14

References

External links

1990 births
Living people
People from Villa María
Argentine footballers
Association football forwards
Argentine expatriate footballers
Expatriate footballers in Guatemala
Argentine expatriate sportspeople in Guatemala
Primera Nacional players
Torneo Argentino A players
Torneo Federal A players
Liga Nacional de Fútbol de Guatemala players
Instituto footballers
Racing Club de Avellaneda footballers
Club y Biblioteca Ramón Santamarina footballers
Club Cipolletti footballers
C.D. Suchitepéquez players
Defensores de Belgrano de Villa Ramallo players
Talleres de Remedios de Escalada footballers
Independiente Rivadavia footballers
Sportspeople from Córdoba Province, Argentina